The Symphony No. 4 in D major, K. 19, by Wolfgang Amadeus Mozart was composed in London during the Mozart family's Grand Tour of Europe in 1765, when Mozart was 9 years old.

Background 
Even though the original of Mozart's manuscript has not survived, the set of parts written in the hand of his father, Leopold Mozart, is preserved in the Bavarian State Library in Munich. It is known today that the early symphonies by young Mozart were performed at the public concerts in the Little Haymarket Theatre in London. It is therefore possible that these parts were written for one of these public performances, although Zaslaw concludes that the work was composed or at least completed in The Hague.

Structure 
The work is scored for two oboes, two horns and strings.

There are three movements, as was standard in the early classical music era in which the child Mozart wrote, in the typical fast–slow–fast configuration. They are as follows:
Allegro, D major,  (Common time), 78 bars
Andante, G major, 45 bars
Presto, D major, 106 bars

References

External links 
 
 

04
1765 compositions
Compositions in D major